The Saint Peter's Old Collegians Football Club is an amateur Australian rules football team in the South Australian Amateur Football League (SAAFL) in Australia. SPOC entered SAAFL in 1928 and ranks fourth in the number of seasons played.

SPOCFC is one of the several sports sections belonging to St Peter's College, and the most successful old scholars' club, having won two SAAFL Division 1 premierships in 1935 and 2012. SPOC presently fields four teams for players of all skill and ability levels.

Other sports sections of the College include athletics, badminton, basketball, cricket, field hockey, rowing, soccer, tennis, and water polo.

References

External links 
 
 Team profile on Adelaide Football

s